Saran-e Pain (also Romanized as Sārān-e Pā’īn; also known as Deh-e Dameshgaftī, Sārān, Sārān-e Seyyed Moḩammad, Sārān-e Soflá, and Sārān Soflá) is a village in Shesh Pir Rural District, Hamaijan District, Sepidan County, Fars Province, Iran. At the 2006 census, its population was 710, in 147 families.

References 

Populated places in Sepidan County